H.S. Mukthayaka is a writer in Kannada. She is one of the pioneers of modern woman's poetry in Kannada literature. She is the daughter of the poet Late. Shantarasa.  Hailing from Raichur district, she was a lecturer in Woman's collage and retired as a Principal. She is currently residing in Raichur Disctrict Karanataka

Literary career 
During the 80's Women poetess in Kannada literature did not express freely in their literary works, It was during this time H.S.Mukthayakka   published her first romantic poetry collection Entitled  ‘Naanu Mattu Avanu’.

H.S. Mukthayakka's poems have been Translated in English and Featured in ‘The Penguin anthology of contemporary Indian women poets’ and  ‘Indian Love Poems’ 

Her poems have been translated in Spanish,Spanish language, English, Marathi, Telugu, Tamil and Malayalam and various other languages. she has been Awarded the " Karnataka Sahitya Akademi Award for Poetry"   for one her poetry works.

Ghazal being a rich form in Urdu was first brought to Kannada form by renowned Kannada poet Late. Shantarasa.  Following her father's  footsteps H.S.mukthayakka wrote the most beautiful, Love some Ghazals in Kannada. She created history in Kannada Literary world by Publishing the First ever Ghazal poetry book written in Kannada Entitled ‘ Nalavattu Ghazalugalu’ Her first Ghazal Book is regarded as a guide for Aspirants of Ghazal form. Her various Ghazals are used as an illustration of form and technique which servers as a guide to learn Ghazal form in Kannada. H.S.mukthayakka and her father Late. Shantarasa are the Pioneers of Ghazal form in Kannada Literature.

H. S. Mukthayakka was the member of the Karnataka Sahitya Academy for one term.

Students of Gulburga and Dharwad and Viajyapura university have made Dissertation and M.phil on H. S. Mukthayakka's works.

M.A  students have chosen H. S. Mukthaykka's  Ghazal works and poetry works as one of their main leading topics of studies

H.S.Mukthayakka's  poems have been included in text books of P.U.C to master's degrees of Gulburga, Vijayapura, banglore, Mysore, Manglore  dravidan universites and also in high schools  of Maharashatra

H. S. Mukthayakka's Literary works consists of  five collections of poetry, Three collections of Ghazal Poetry, Five collections of prose, A collection of her entire Ghazal poetry and one collection of Couplets.

Literary works

Poetry collections
 Nanu mattu avanu
 Neevu kaanire Neevu kaanire
 Kabhi Kabhi
 Tanhai 
 Ninagagi bareda kavitegalu

Ghazal poetry
 Nalavattu Ghazalugalu
 Muvattaidu Ghazalugalu
 Nalavattidu Ghazalugalu
 Mai Aur Mere Lamhe ( collection of H.S.Mukthayakka's entire Ghazal poetry)

Prose
 Shivasharani Mukthayakka (for children)
 Dhakkeya Bommanna ( a research work)
 Kannada sahityadalli Sthree Savedanegalu
 Appa ( Compilation book) 
 Madireya Nadinnalli ( Travelogue)

Couplets 
 Avanu madhu saavu ( a collection of couplets)

Awards and honours
 Karnataka Sahitya Akademi Award for Poetry 
 Karanataka Sahitya Academy Vishesha Gaurava Prashasti
 Kannada Sahitya Parishattina Mallika prashasti
 Dharawada Vidhyavardhaka Sanghada Mato Shri Ratnamma Hegede prashasti
 Gadagina Kala parishattina prashasti
 Sedamna Amma prashasti
 Gulburga Vishwavidyalaya Rajyotsava prashasti
 S.R. Patil Pratishtanada Smt. Manikyamma prashasti

References 

Kannada poets
Indian women poets
Writers from Karnataka
21st-century Indian women writers
Living people